The Gaborone Dam is a dam on the Notwane River in Botswana with a capacity of .
The dam is operated by the Water Utilities Corporation,  and supplies water to the capital city of Gaborone.

Location

The Gaborone Dam is located south of Gaborone along the Gaborone-Lobatse road, and provides water for both Gaborone and Lobatse.   
Average potential evapotranspiration is about  annually.

Description

Dam construction began in 1963, capturing water from the Notwane River, at a time when the new capital city of Gaborone was in the planning stages.
The original dam was complete in 1964.
The dam is an earthcore fill structure.
During the 1965-66 rainy season the reservoir filled and overflowed.

Raising the dam had to be done extremely carefully to ensure that the impervious upstream zone of the dam remained intact and was extended up the raised bank.

Until completion of the Dikgatlhong Dam in 2011, the Gaborone dam was the largest in Botswana.

Issues

After the dam was opened and filled, the average water levels began to drop. In part, this was due to a cyclical change in rainfall, reducing the amount of water fed into the reservoir and increasing the impact of evaporation in the hot, dry climate. In part it was due to growth of the city and growing per-capita demand for water as the population became more affluent, using water for purposes such as filling swimming pools and washing cars. By the end of 2002 the reservoir was 79% full, and by the start of 2004 it was 54% full. By the end of 2004 the reservoir was just 27% full and the government was forced to impose harsh restrictions on water use.

In the drought-prone country, the water supply is a constant concern. A neon signboard in the city informs residents how full the reservoir is. The reservoir and the green buffer zone that surrounds it are the largest and most fragile ecosystem in the Gaborone area. A book published in 2004 noted that storm water drainage is poor in Gaborone, causing recurring street floods, and that pit latrines and overflowing sewage ponds endanger the water in the reservoir.

Reservoir use

The reservoir is starting to be marketed as a recreational area. The northern end of the reservoir is planned to become an entertainment venue called The Waterfront. 
There is a yacht club, called Gaborone Yacht Club, on the northern side of the lake. 
The southern end houses the Kalahari Fishing Club and a new public facility called City Scapes. City Scapes contains parks, playgrounds, and boating facilities.
The dam is popular with birdwatchers, windsurfers, and anglers.
However, there is no swimming due to crocodiles and parasitic bilharzias, which can transmit the serious disease schistosomiasis.

Gallery

References
Notes

Citations

Sources

 

Reservoirs and dams in Botswana
Dams completed in 1964
Earth-filled dams
Dams in Botswana